Třemošnice is a town in the Pardubice Region of the Czech Republic.

It may also refer to places in the Czech Republic:

Třemošnice, a village and administrative part of Ostředek in the Central Bohemian Region